Pedee is an unincorporated community in Polk County, Oregon, United States.  Pedee is at the intersection of Oregon Route 223 and Maple Grove Road. It is part of the Salem Metropolitan Statistical Area.

External links

Salem, Oregon metropolitan area
Unincorporated communities in Polk County, Oregon
Unincorporated communities in Oregon